A Chance to Live is a 1949 American short documentary film directed by James L. Shute, produced by Richard de Rochemont for Time Inc. and distributed by Twentieth Century-Fox. It is part of The March of Time series and portrays Monsignor John Patrick Carroll-Abbing building and running a Boys' Home in Italy.

The film won an Oscar at the 22nd Academy Awards in 1950 for Documentary Short Subject. The Academy Film Archive preserved A Chance to Live in 2005.

References

External links

1949 films
1940s short documentary films
American black-and-white films
American short documentary films
Films shot in Italy
The March of Time films
20th Century Fox short films
Best Documentary Short Subject Academy Award winners
Black-and-white documentary films
1949 documentary films
1940s English-language films
1940s American films